The Cave of Bacinete (Spanish: Cueva de Bacinete) is a cave located in Los Alcornocales Natural Park, Los Barrios, province of Andalusia, south Spain. It contains examples of prehistoric rock art and was declared Property of cultural interest in 1985.

References

External links
 Arte Sureño

Bacinete
Los Alcornocales Natural Park
Tourist attractions in Andalusia
Bien de Interés Cultural landmarks in the Province of Cádiz
Bacinete